Shell Glacier is a western lobe of the Mount Bird icecap. It descends steeply in the valley north of Trachyte Hill and Harrison Bluff in the center of the ice-free area on the lower western slopes of Mount Bird, Ross Island. Mapped and so named by the New Zealand Geological Survey Antarctic Expedition (NZGSAE), 1958–59, because of the marine shell content of the moraines.

Glaciers of Ross Island